Yeh Hui-Mei is the fourth studio album by Taiwanese singer Jay Chou, released on 29 July 2003 by Alfa Music. The album was named after his mother.

The album was nominated for eight Golden Melody Awards and won two awards, including Best Pop Vocal Album and Best Music Video for "Class 3-2". The album also won an IFPI Hong Kong Top Sales Music Award for Best Selling Mandarin Album of the Year.

The tracks, "Sunny Day", "Her Eyelashes", and "East Wind Breaks", are listed at number 2, number 15, and number 41 respectively on the 2003's Hit FM Top 100 Singles of the Year chart.

Track listing

Awards

References

External links
  Jay Chou discography@JVR Music

2003 albums
Jay Chou albums
Sony Music Taiwan albums